The Race to the North was the name given by the press to occasions in two summers of the late 19th century when British passenger trains belonging to different companies would literally race each other from London to Edinburgh over the two principal rail trunk routes connecting the English capital city to Scotland – the West Coast Main Line which runs from London Euston via Crewe and Carlisle and the East Coast Main Line route from London King's Cross via York and Newcastle. The "races" were never official and publicly the companies denied that what happened was racing at all. Results were not announced officially and the outcomes have since been hotly debated. In the 20th century there were also occasions of competition for speed on the two routes.

Background

The late nineteenth century was a boom time for the railways in Britain with many independent companies operating but with poor coordination between the companies' lines. Gradually merger and other formal agreements were made so that travel across the country became feasible. For the first time long-distance rail travel could be afforded by the general public.  By the 1880s two consortia in particular provided services between London and Edinburgh using separate routes on the east and west coasts of Britain terminating in London at King's Cross and  stations, and in Edinburgh at Waverley and Princes Street stations. Great Northern Railway (GNR) and North Eastern Railway (NER) ran the East Coast service with London & North Western Railway (LNWR) and Caledonian Railway (CR) on the West Coast. The companies each had territories where they owned the track or had legally enforcible running rights on some other tracks. At the "borders" between these companies' territories – York and Carlisle – locomotives were always changed (and they were generally changed at intermediate points also) but passengers did not necessarily have to change carriage.

In 1888, driven by commercial rivalry, the East Coast and West Coast consortia started competing fiercely over the speed of their express services over these two routes.

By the 1890s an east coast route had been established further north through Scotland over the Forth and Tay bridges allowing the North British Railway (NBR) to provide a reasonably direct Edinburgh to Aberdeen service so as to extend the East Coast consortium's King's Cross to Scotland route. Although NBR owned the track from further south at Berwick-on-Tweed, NER had running rights to Edinburgh. Caledonian already had a route connecting Carlisle and Aberdeen via Stirling and Perth. In 1895 a second "race" broke out but this time with the added excitement of arriving at the same station in Aberdeen. Indeed, after some 500 miles from London, the two routes converged to being in sight of each other just before Kinnaber Junction from where there was a single track to Aberdeen.

In 1901 Midland Railway and North British Railway ran an accelerated London St Pancras to Edinburgh Waverley express. East Coast responded by speeding up and West Coast briefly joined in. Although the press hoped for a new "Race", nothing came of it.

London to Edinburgh, 1888

From 1885 the main London to Edinburgh services were as follows.

East Coast had a very strong hold on the traffic and this was consolidated further when in November 1887 those companies announced that the  Special Scotch Express would also take 3rd class passengers. West Coast, faced with dwindling traffic, took a decisive step. Delaying their announcement to the last minute, they stated in June 1888 that the Day Scotch Express would now arrive in Edinburgh an hour earlier, at 19:00. On 1 July the East Coast arrival time became 18:30, with the lunch stop at York being reduced from 30 to 20 minutes – on 1 August West Coast matched this time, cutting out stops between Carlisle and Edinburgh, but East Coast, seemingly in anticipation, started arriving at 18:00 on the same day. West Coast were determined to match this time and decided to run two separate trains with fewer carriages – the racing train travelled non-stop from Euston to Crewe.

This schedule started on 6 August, Bank Holiday, with the press now taking full notice, crowds turning out at Euston and bookmakers taking bets on the results. To the surprise of the experts on that first day the LNWR locomotive to Crewe was the 25-year-old Problem class Waverley 2-2-2 single. Another surprise was that Caledonian ran its brand new and unique No. 123 4-2-2 single and this locomotive was used every day of the series. In fact, both trains used to arrive in Edinburgh earlier than scheduled and reporters would guess which train would arrive first and then would race the mile length of Princes Street in hansom cabs in the hope of seeing the other train arrive. The results were cabled to the New York Herald for reporting the next day. By 13 August East Coast booked an arrival time of 17:45, omitting the stop at Berwick and averaging  between Newcastle and Edinburgh. On the same day West Coast abandoned any timetable at intermediate stations and the train left as soon as it was able. In this way they beat the East Coast "record" even before it had been made. Worse, East Coast arrived later than scheduled although they made amends on 31 August, arriving at 17:27. However, on 14 August the companies held a conference in London and it was agreed that minimum journey times of 7¾ hours (East Coast) and 8 hours (West Coast) would be adhered to during the rest of that month and then times would be increased by 30 minutes.

Throughout the period, the Midland Railway, who had recently completed the Settle and Carlisle Line, and the North British Railway (NBR) on the Waverley Line were faced with a longer route – from London St Pancras via Manchester and Carlisle to Edinburgh Waverley – with many curves and gradients and so they were unable to be competitive on speed.

So, after August, and the end of the holidays, the racing came to an end although there were now 29 express trains a day between London and Scotland (in both directions) compared with 16 in 1885. A new prospect was appearing, however, and the Pall Mall Gazette wrote: "The main cause confronts us when we see those three stupendous towers of steel which loom above the horizon of Edinburgh. When the Forth Bridge is finished the North Western and Caledonian will have to struggle hard if they wish to retain much of the traffic to Dundee or Aberdeen".

The companies' locomotives and trains in the 1880s

Innovations in steam locomotive design included the introduction of compound engines and bogie rather than axle leading wheels. The railway companies had their own individual locomotive works and locomotive designers.

The latest express NER engines were Tennant 2-4-0s and the T. W. Worsdell–von Borries compound Worsdell 'F' 4-4-0s which were powerful, although not so fast.
Having compound engines required the development of sufficiently strong steel coupling rods for fast running and the 4-4-0s developed from 2-4-0s when it was found that a front bogie gave greater high speed stability. The East Coast route had no severe gradients and was slightly shorter than the west.

Up to the 1880s with LNWR, rail transport was relatively local and leisurely and the express LNWR locomotives had been designed for economy rather than speed. The Precedent 2-4-0s were outstanding for the time and would turn out eventually to have a good turn of speed. Francis Webb compound steam engines were starting to be introduced but were not yet notably powerful or economic. Regarding the principal express Caledonian locomotives, Dugald Drummond 4-4-0s were good for climbing but were untested for speed. Their earlier locomotives needed to be run double-headed. They had introduced a new locomotive, the Single No. 123 4-2-2, which was untested. For the West Coast line the climbs to summits of Shap and Beattock were the steepest gradients.

For the 1888 accelerations, the West Coast companies willingly double-headed their express trains and so had power in hand. For GNR their Stirling locomotives design did not allow double-heading and the new third class passengers were creating a greater load. Caledonian now ran two separate trains north from Carlisle, to Glasgow and Edinburgh, though these were single-headed. However, the journey time improvements came from cutting waiting times and delays as much as by raising running speed. Trains ran lightly loaded, typically with only four or five carriages.

London to Aberdeen, 1895

The railways arrived in Aberdeen in 1850 and an east coast through service was instituted in 1855, taking 17½ hours from London, reduced by 1889 to nearly 13 hours. The timetables for the main expresses were as follows.

At the beginning of 1893 West Coast accelerated the Day Scotch Express to arrive at 22:25 and devised a scheme for delaying its rivals at Kinnaber Junction, where Caledonian operated the signal box. The booked time at Dubton, the Caledonian line signalbox before Kinnaber, was six minutes before the time booked for Kinnaber although the journey only took two minutes. The Dubton signalman would offer the train to Kinnaber at its booked Dubton time at the latest – which might be earlier than its actual time. The Kinnaber signalman would accept the train thus keeping the signals against North British. The North British train was only given clearance if it actually passed the North British Montrose signal box before the Dubton booking time. By this means until NBR realised what was happening and complained, Caledonian could take priority even with its rival already waiting at Kinnaber.

In the event, competition focussed on the overnight expresses. East Coast soon changed its timetable to arrive at Aberdeen at 08:15 and West Coast followed suit with 08:05. However, whereas West Coast ran a reliable service, North British were often late because of slow changes of engine at Waverley station, and a tortuous and undulating run from there northwards on a line that was partially single track. By June 1893, East Coast had a booked arrival time of 07:35 and West Coast 07:50. However, if the North British train was slightly late it would be beaten to Kinnaber Junction and not be able to pass the Caledonian train. Caledonian owned the line from Kinnaber to Aberdeen but NBR held running rights (Caledonian required running rights over a very short section of NBR line at Monklands, Lanarkshire).

By 1 July 1895 these times had been brought forward to 07:20 (East) and 07:40 (West). This involved NER reaching Edinburgh in 8 hours 13 minutes, in breach of the 1888 agreement not to take less than 8½ hours. In practice West Coast, stopping at seven intermediate stations on its route and pulling trains of 15 to 17 carriages, was frequently arriving later than 08:00. Without prior warning, on 15 July, West Coast widely advertised a new arrival time of 07:00, reducing the intermediate stops to five, and next morning the train actually arrived at 06:47 and on the next run 06:21 was achieved. Inevitably East Coast announced a new arrival time of 06:45 which, although earlier than the West Coast booked time, was nevertheless beaten by the actual West Coast arrivals. There were urgent communications within the East Coast consortium about whether to try and negotiate their way out of the developing race until on 25 July the Marquis of Tweedale, NBR chairman, wired John Conacher, NBR general manager "My opinion is our best policy is to beat them at any cost...". The NBR train arrived at 06:23, two minutes ahead of the new booked time, only to find the rival train had arrived 06:06.

From the beginning of August the newspapers were reporting on what they called the "Race to the North" and Kinnaber Junction, until that time an unknown outpost, was analysed in detail. Crowds gathered at the various stations. Even in the early hours of the morning men, women and children gathered at Carlisle Citadel station to join the excitement. For the newspapers sensation required not just speed but also potential disaster and the dangers were debated. At Cupar in Fife the permanent-way gang was called out each night to correct the rails after the express had passed round the curve at speed – the displacement was about three inches.

19/20 August 1895

Unusually, on 18 August East Coast arrived at Aberdeen first. This was achieved by reducing the number of carriages to seven at most, by not allowing passengers to get on or off the train at intermediate stations south of Dundee, and by making greater time allowances for keeping the line clear of other traffic. The companies' internal telegrams make no bones about calling it a "race". The next night, sworn to secrecy, three elite railway journalists were invited to travel. After measuring a speed of  approaching the S curves at Portobello (where the speed limit was 15 mph) they were flung to the floor and the train was still going  entering Waverley station. The engines were changed in two minutes but a station official kept the train waiting another 8½ minutes. Time was more than made up by Dundee and there was no problem at Kinnaber so the train arrived at Aberdeen at 05:30. The Caledonian train had got in 16 minutes earlier – with only four carriages.

20–23 August 1895
On the night of 20/21 August both trains made exceptionally good time. NBR had decided to split their train at Waverley with the slower part not due to reach Aberdeen until 06:25. A "considerable number of people" at Dundee station were there to cheer, even at 03:42. Approaching Kinnaber Junction just before dawn at four in the morning, the trains could be seen from each other across the Montrose Basin.

By this time the leading newspapers had reporters at all the stations to telegraph in their accounts of the night. Crowds thronged the platforms. NBR were quickly out of Waverley and beat Caledonian to Kinnaber by 15 minutes, arriving in Aberdeen at 04:40. A "leading official" of LNWR stated "We don't admit that we're racing at all. We only claim that it's possible for us to arrive in Aberdeen at the same time as the trains of the East Coast Railway...". Both trains had averaged over 60 mph London to Aberdeen. NBR general manager John Conacher telegraphed his GNR counterpart Sir Henry Oakley "After this morning's achievement I think we ought to revert to advertised time ... There is a feeling here that rivalry has gone far enough already...". That afternoon the press were told that East Coast would in future arrive at 06:20 – the competitive racing was over.

That evening (22 August) at Euston station there was the usual excitement. West Coast wanted to regain the advantage and next morning the Yorkshire Post were able to report "A Sensational Achievement by the West Coast Express". Pulling only three carriages and leaving out the stop at Stirling, Aberdeen was reached at 04:32. A Caledonian Railway publicity postcard of the time shows the figure of their engine driver John Souter standing alone by his locomotive at Aberdeen station. This picture is belied by the report in the Daily Sketch – "Driver Souter, who has all along been in charge of this engine, is the railway hero of the moment ... There was much excitement at Aberdeen on the great day, the train being waited for by a crowd of spectators. Souter and his stoker were borne shoulder-high...".

In his 1958 book about the series of races, Oswald Nock wrote of the 22/23 August journey, "And at that astonishing average speed of 63.3 mph made sixty-three years ago the London–Aberdeen record still stands today".

The companies' locomotives and trains in the 1890s

Between 1888 and 1895 better-built bogie carriages were becoming available. LNWR had started introducing improved  rails and were still the only company with water troughs. There had also been some important development in express locomotive design.

GNR had the same locomotives as before but NER had made considerable changes. Improved piston valves were introduced generally. The large and heavy Worsdell M 4-4-0 was introduced, designed with an eye towards speed – apart from the early models, these had compound cylinders. These achieved the highest average speeds of all, including  over a  stretch. The Worsdell J class 4-2-2 was converted from compound to simple expansion working. NBR had four classes of 4-4-0, the earliest by Drummond and the rest by Matthew Holmes..

It retained uncoupled driving wheels but had a larger boiler and good steam flow design. The Improved Precedent ("Jumbo") 2-4-0 was as fast but could not take such a heavy load. Caledonian was still running the Drummond 4-4-0s but now complemented by the Lambie version with increased boiler pressure and estimated by Nock to have averaged  over an  stretch.

In August up until the time of the serious racing the express trains ran 8 to 15 carriages ("comparatively light", up to ) with LNER and Caledonian double-heading when there were more than about 12 carriages. North of Edinburgh and Perth both trains were reduced by one carriage. So, passenger accommodation was very comparable. Changing of engines could be done in as little as 90 seconds.

Fastest runs

Oswald Nock summarised the four fastest runs in the following table. He chose stretches of line roughly equal in length and level in aggregate. Each contained one "severe slack" that required slow running.

Nock picks out another exceptional run of a rather different nature. In the early hours of 22 August the NBR Holmes No. 293 4-4-0 left Waverley for Dundee with a load of 86 tons. Nock, writing towards the end of the steam era in 1958, says that since World War I no train had done the run in less than 80 minutes.

Aftermath of the 1895 races

North British considered restarting the competition with Conacher writing to Oakley "Although I share to the full your opinion regarding the childishness of the whole business ... I am quite prepared to run another train as much like theirs as possible, when I have no doubt we could again shew our superiority". To achieve the high speeds very few carriages could be pulled and so a second, longer, slower train had to follow on behind. There was no benefit to the public in arriving so very early and, apart from the publicity, it made no financial sense. For all these reasons the racing was not resumed. In a leading article The Engineer magazine concluded "One gratifying result of the race will be perhaps to silence the boasting of the American press. The far-famed Empire State Express has been thoroughly beaten...".

In July 1896 a West Coast overnight express took the curve at  excessively fast and derailed. One person was killed and the train was wrecked. Two "Jumbos" had been double-heading the train and the enquiry found that the only experience either driver had on the line had always involved stopping at Preston. To reassure the public, agreement was reached to slow the runs from London to Edinburgh and Glasgow to take a minimum time of eight hours. This agreement, which gave much the same journey time as in 1889, lasted into the early 1930s removing any impetus towards improving express train performance or scheduling.

Later rivalry 

With the end of specially staged train races, later rivalries between the West Coast and East Coast routes centred on timetabled services based largely on improvements in traction technologies.

London to Edinburgh, 1901

For its summer 1901 service the Midland Railway and NBR consortium announced the 09:30 London St Pancras express – on the Settle & Carlisle and Waverley lines – would arrive in Edinburgh at 18:05, ten minutes before the GNR/NER Flying Scotsman. Concerned in case a delayed Midland train might lead to Portobello East junction becoming like Kinnaber, NER rescheduled their train for 18:02 and then earlier, ignoring the 1896 agreement. The press were anxious to promote this as another "Race to the North" and started publicising Caledonian arrival times as well. Indeed, Caledonian and then NER put on fast runs for a few days but NBR backed down and the sparring came to an end.

LNER and LMS
In 1923, under the Railways Act 1921 which grouped multiple railway companies together into four large ones, the ECML came under control of the amalgamated London and North Eastern Railway (LNER) whilst the WCML came under the London, Midland and Scottish Railway (LMS).

In 1927 LNER started the famous non-stop express train Flying Scotsman from London King's Cross to Edinburgh. This was done by means of a special corridor tender which allowed engine crew changes at speed. However, to show that the old rivalry was not dead, just prior to the inaugural date of the LNER train, the LMS thwarted them by running separate "non-stop" trains from London Euston to Glasgow and London to Edinburgh. These were operated respectively by one of the new Royal Scot locomotives and by a standard LMS Compound 4-4-0 locomotive both with volunteer crews.

Following the successful launching of the German Flying Hamburger high-speed diesel railcar set in 1933 and the Bugatti cars in France, the LNER began to examine the possibilities of introducing similar trains for key services. On examining German specifications, management concluded that better speed and accommodation should be possible using steam locomotive powered trains. To test the feasibility of this a high-speed trial was run in 1934 between London and Leeds using locomotive 4472 Flying Scotsman, then in modified A1 condition. On a similar test run from London to Newcastle and back, A3 No 2750 Papyrus reached , a world record for a non-streamlined steam locomotive. The high-speed service was extended to Edinburgh in 1937 with the introduction of The Coronation.

The LMS again countered in 1937 with the London-Glasgow Coronation Scot streamlined train for which an updated Pacific locomotive type, the Princess Coronation Class, was also specially developed. The train stayed on the tracks, but nearly derailed, this caused enough alarm for the LMS not to make another attempt at a speed record.     

A record which still stands to this day. The intervention of World War II from 1939, and subsequent postwar nationalisation to form British Railways in 1948, curtailed further rivalry between the east and west coast routes.

British Rail
In 1979, British Rail set a new record of 3 hours 52 minutes on the  length of the WCML between Euston and Glasgow with its revolutionary Advanced Passenger Train (APT). However these times cannot normally be achieved on the WCML under normal operating conditions as it requires other services on the line to be specially re-timed in order to provide a train path for a non-stop express from Glasgow to London.

The two routes today 

When Britain's railways were privatised in the mid-1990s, the East Coast and West Coast routes were now once again operated by two different companies – GNER and Virgin Trains West Coast. Between 2015 and 2018, both routes operated under the Virgin Trains brand, albeit with Virgin Trains East Coast being mostly a Stagecoach Group operation. This ended in June 2018 when the East Coast franchise returned to public ownership, under the revived LNER name.

See also
 Top Gear's Race to the North, a 21st-century interpretation by Top Gear pitting a car, bike and steam locomotive in a race from London to Edinburgh.

Notes

References

Citations

Works cited

Further reading
  A comprehensive review of the participants in the 1895 Railway Races to the North

External links 
 National Railway Museum – Locomotives – Stirling Single

History of rail transport in the United Kingdom
1895 in rail transport
1888 in rail transport
1901 in rail transport
1895 in the United Kingdom
1888 in the United Kingdom
1901 in the United Kingdom